James Norris Ormiston (30 May 1915 – 7 August 1977) was a Progressive Conservative party member of the House of Commons of Canada. He was born in Regina, Saskatchewan and became a farmer and insurance agent by career.

He was first elected at the Melville riding in the 1958 general election after unsuccessful bids for a seat there in 1953 and 1957. Ormiston was re-elected in 1962, 1963 and 1965. With riding boundary changes, Ormiston became a candidate at the Yorkton—Melville riding for the 1968 election where he was defeated by Lorne Nystrom of the New Democratic Party.

References

External links
 

1915 births
1977 deaths
Members of the House of Commons of Canada from Saskatchewan
Politicians from Regina, Saskatchewan
Progressive Conservative Party of Canada MPs